John David Philip Meldrum (18 July 1940 in Rabat, Morocco; died 9 August 2018 in Edinburgh, Scotland) was a British Mathematician. Meldrum was an algebraist and his research was mostly related to group theory.

Biography 
Meldrum was born in Rabat, Morocco. 

In 1964 he was appointed as a Supernumerary Fellow and College Lecturer in Mathematics at Emmanuel College. Meldrum received his Ph.D. from the University of Cambridge in 1967 on the topic of "Central Series in Wreath Products". His supervisor was Derek Roy Taunt.
 
In 1969 he became a lecturer for mathematics at the University of Edinburgh and in 1982 he was appointed there as a senior lecturer.

He died on 9 August 2018 in Edinburgh after a battle with the Parkinson's disease.

Publications

Books

As an author

As a translator 
Meldrum translated the following book by Nicolas Bourbaki

Research articles

References 

His biography in the bulletin of the London Mathematical Society:

1940 births
2018 deaths
Alumni of Emmanuel College, Cambridge
Alumni of the University of Cambridge
British mathematicians
People from Rabat